Malaysia is a multi-ethnic country, with a predominantly Muslim population. Racial discrimination is embodied within the social and economic policies of the Malaysian government, favouring the Malays and in principle, the natives of Sabah and Sarawak. However, in practice, the natives of Sabah and Sarawak do not benefit much from these policies, with natives of Sabah and Sarawak composing the bulk of bottom 40% income cohort of Malaysia. Rather, it is the Malays that obtain heavily subsidised education in local universities and make up the bulk of these universities, including in terms of employment. In fact, the resources of Sarawak have been exploited for decades, with the Malaysian government enriching governmental officials and their associates. The concept of Ketuanan Melayu or Malay supremacy is accepted by the Malay-majority political sphere.

While 179 countries have ratified the International Convention on the Elimination of All Forms of Racial Discrimination (ICERD), Malaysia is not one of them.  The Pakatan Harapan government that replaced Barisan Nasional in 2018 had indicated a readiness to ratify ICERD, but has yet to do so due to the convention's conflict with the Malaysian constitution and the race and religious norms in Malaysia established since its independence.

Demographics

Malays make up the majority — according to the 2010 census figures, over 50% of the 28.3 million population (including non-citizens) are Malays. About 22.6% of the population is Chinese Malaysians (Malaysians of Chinese descent) and Indian Malaysians (Malaysians of Indian descent) comprise about 6.6% of the population. People of Indians descent are derogatorily called Keling in Malaysia. There are also a very small minority of aborigines whose ancestors or Orang Asli arrived in what is today Malaysia well over 7,000 years before the Malays arrived from what is today Taiwan roughly 3,000 years ago. These ancient people also split with some heading to Sulawesi and others progressing into Java, and Sumatra. The final migration was to the Malay Peninsula roughly 3,000 years ago. A sub-group from Borneo moved to Champa in Vietnam roughly 4,500 years ago.  The Champa group eventually moved to present day Kelantan in Malaysia. There are also traces of the Dong Song and HoaBinh migration from Vietnam and Cambodia.  There was also the Southern Thai migration, from what we know as Patani (Narathiwat, Pattani, Yala, South Songkhla) today.  All these groups share DNA and linguistic origins traceable to Taiwan, if not to southern China.  Yet the Malay and Chinese (and also Indian) communities in Malaysia today appear at times at odds with each other given the polarisation caused by various policies under the Bumiputera policy.

The British, who had colonised what is now the Malaysian Peninsula starting in 1876, had recognized the Malay states, as recorded by numerous literature by Frank Swettenham, Hugh Clifford and many more of their scholars. Historians have noted that Western imperialism in Asia, including Malaysia, led to the importation of racial theories from Europe, contributing to a fundamental shift in the perception of race among Asians. During the colonial era, Chinese Malaysians remained mostly isolated in the mining regions where they worked. In addition, some Chinese Malaysians were settled around the major towns while the Malays, had established their own villages.  The legacy of the "Malay Supremacy" of Mahathir, who is only half-Malay as his father came from Kerala, India, has created a chasm cutting through the fabric of Malaysian society. Indeed, in 2017, Mahathir insinuated former Prime Minister Najib Razak was a robber due to his Buginese racial background. During the lead-up to the 2018 elections in Malaysia, an election Mahathir won, he fanned anti-Chinese sentiments in the country by warning of an influx of foreign Chinese property owners. Such exploitation of race and religion for power has shattered the concept of a "Malaysian Malaysia" proposed by Lee Kuan Yew, with talent being lost to foreign countries due to exclusive job opportunities for the Malays.

Presently, Malay is the national language of Malaysia. While it is unique that more than four languages are spoken widely in Malaysia today (English, Malay, Chinese and Tamil), the ethnic languages are mainly used by the ethnic groups respectively. The divide is quite prominent, especially in west Malaysia, since the Malays mostly attend the Malaysian national schools but the Chinese and also the Indians, have created their own vernacular schools, placing importance on their respective languages.

Tools of persecution

Human rights of religious and ethnic minorities in Malaysia, including Buddhists, Hindus, Sikhs, Indians and Malaysian Chinese, are systematically, officially and legally violated regularly in an institutionalised manner.

New Economic Policy as institutionalised mechanism to persecute non-Muslim minorities

Government policies of positive discrimination favour the Malay majority and the Bumiputera status, particularly in areas such as housing, finance, governance and education. Economic policies designed to favour Bumiputera, including affirmative action in public education, were implemented in the 1970s in order to defuse inter-ethnic tensions following the May 13 Incident in 1969. However, these policies have not been fully effective in eradicating poverty among rural Bumiputeras and have further caused a backlash especially from Chinese and Indian minorities.  The policies are enshrined in the Malaysian constitution and questioning them is technically illegal.

UMNO, the ruling party since Malaysia's independence from Britain - until May 2018 depended on the majority Malay population for votes by using laws that give Malays priority over other races in areas such as employment, education, finance, and housing. Such policies has been cited in Article 153 of the Constitution of Malaysia. UMNO also promotes ketuanan Melayu, which is the idea that the ethnic Malays (Bumiputeras) should get special privileges in Malaysia.

Pro-Bumiputera Malays claim that The Federation of Malaya Agreement signed on 21 January 1948 at King House by the Malay rulers and by Sir Edward Gent as the representative of the British government lets Malays be the leaders among three races. However, others have claimed that the Agreement promises equality to all three races who made up the population of Malaysia. However, in 1951  the UMNO began enshrining the rights of Malays over all other races in law. Today, Malays dominate in politics at both national and state levels, in the civil service, military and security forces. The Chinese have traditionally dominated in the economy and live in large numbers in urban areas of Malaysia.

The Malay-controlled government ensures that all Bumiputeras of Malay origin are given preferential treatment when it comes to the number of student places in Government universities, and many Chinese and Indians have chosen to study in private universities. Government benefits for Malays include discounts for new houses and preferential treatment in public housing, cheaper burial plots, that all key government positions to be held by Malays including most sporting associations, a minimum of a 30% Malay Bumiputera equity to be held in listed companies, full funding for mosques and Islamic places of worship, special high earning interest trust funds for Bumiputera Malays, special share allocation for new share applications for Bumiputera Malays, and making the Malay language a compulsory examination paper.

While the government has given special provisions and rights to the Malays through documented legal texts, they have also allowed certain practices by the Buddhist, Hindu and other religious minorities to be practised according to their religious beliefs, as is enshrined in Article 3 of the Federal Constitution.

The lack of meritocracy in the Malaysian education system is a valid concern, and this creates even more disparity between various groups in Malaysia. In the tertiary education system, one of the options after taking the Sijil Pelajaran Malaysia is the matriculation system. However, matriculation is highly limited for non-Malays, with 90 percent of the available spots going to Malays.

In 1968, Prof. al-Attas, a member of the GERAKAN, engaged in a debate with Lim Kit Siang and the Opposition from the Democratic Action Party (DAP)6 on the subject of Indonesian literature being made as part of the corpus of Malay Language literature, and on the idea of a Malaysian Malaysia. Responding towards Lim Kit Siang's claim that adopting Malay as the national language is racist and chauvinistic, Prof al-Attas argued that Malays cannot be accused as racist because a Chinese who becomes a Muslim and speaks the Malay Language can be considered a Malay; a Malay, however, can never be a Chinese. By this definition, however, a Malay that renounces Islam is no longer a Malay.

In 2010, a Malaysian court sentenced a Malay to just a week in jail and only fined 11 others for a brandishing a cow's head during a protest against the construction of a Hindu temple.  Critics said the light sentences would further strain race relations between the majority Malay Muslims and minority Hindu Indians, Chinese as well as Christians of various races who complain of discrimination. The 12 were from a group who had marched in August 2009 with the bloodied head of a cow, to protest a plan to build a Hindu temple in their mainly Muslim neighbourhood. Hindus, who consider the cow to be a sacred animal, were offended and angered.

Racism in the Job Environment 
A study by the Centre for Governance and Political Studies (Cent-GPS) made an experiment Study on 7 fictitious candidates by sending a small sample size of 7 fictitious resumes representing 7 candidates: male and female Malay, Indian and Chinese candidates, 3,829 times in total to over 500 job vacancies across the Klang Valley. No fictitious Sabahan nor Sarawakians were involved in this study. Out of these 7 fictitious candidates, the study concluded that employers in the business sector are actively looking for Chinese candidates. 

The study had 3 hypothesis, first ethnic Malay applicants will be discriminated against in Malaysia's business sector compared to their non-bumiputera peers. The study found out that the fictitious Chinese candidates dominated the callbacks by a huge margin. The two male and female Chinese candidates obtained more job callbacks than their Malay and Indian counterparts combined. No details regarding whether it was a Malay management company, an Indian management company or Chinese management company were included in the study, a confound that would likely lead to a skew in the results given the racial tensions and linguistic barriers in Malaysia due to the lack of a communal lingua franca that is neutral and which does not favour any one race.  

The second hypothesis was Mandarin is a key factor in helping or boosting a candidate's chance of securing a job interview. The study finds that when companies list “Mandarin required” in their advertisement, it is actually a filter to hire Chinese candidates. Their third hypothesis was the hijab plays a crucial factor in determining a candidate's successfully job application. The study found out that a Malay girl without a hijab gets more callbacks than a Malay girl who wears a hijab. 

The study concluded that even as candidates had the same qualifications, education and experience, the ethnicity of a candidate still plays a vital role in the success of a job application for a business graduate. Only business graduates were studied in this study, with other fields of study being suitable for an attempt for replication of this study.

See also
2001 Kampung Medan riots
Article 153 of the Constitution of Malaysia
Hindu Rights Action Force
Ketuanan Melayu
Perkasa
Racial politics in Malaysia

References

Articles

James Chin, The Malaysian Chinese Dilemma: The Never Ending Policy (NEP), Chinese Southern Studies (2008)

 
Malaysia
Malaysian culture
Malaysia